"Boom" is a song by Armenian-American heavy metal band System of a Down, released as a promotional single from their third studio album, Steal This Album!

Overview 
This single is the second single released from Steal This Album!. As in the case with most songs from Steal This Album!, it has only been played live on very few occasions, with only once confirmed performance. In a Reddit AMA, drummer John Dolmayan stated, "We have played Boom! a few times but because it's a spoken word song, it doesn't have the same impact live."

The song was leaked on the Toxicity II bootleg under the name "Everytime".

Music video 
For the music video, the band worked with filmmaker Michael Moore. The video uses footage from the February 15, 2003 anti-war protests. The video also shows a cartoon of George W. Bush, Saddam Hussein, Tony Blair, and Osama Bin Laden riding rockets over a city, referencing the Four Horsemen of the Apocalypse.

Shortly after its release, the video was banned from MTV Europe.

Track listing

References

External links 
Video musical de "Boom!"

2002 songs
System of a Down songs
2003 singles
Song recordings produced by Rick Rubin
Songs written by Daron Malakian
Songs written by Serj Tankian